Dog Sees God: Confessions of a Teenage Blockhead is a play written by Bert V. Royal.

An "unauthorized continuation," the play reimagines characters from the popular comic strip Peanuts as degenerate teenagers. Drug use, child sexual abuse, suicide, eating disorders, teen violence, rebellion, sexual relations and identity are among the issues covered in this homage of the works of Charles M. Schulz.

Characters 
CB (Charlie Brown) is the main character in the play. He is intensely saddened over the death of his dog, and is forced to question both his sexuality and his social status when he unwittingly falls for his classmate Beethoven.
Beethoven (Schroeder) became the school outcast prior to events in the play when it was revealed that he was sexually abused by his father. A bit of a recluse, Beethoven takes solace in playing the piano, but when he and CB become romantically involved, his world is turned upside down.  
CB's Sister (Sally) has gone Goth, at least for a portion of the play. It is mentioned that, like her character basis, she changes her philosophy on life often. Her other personas during the course of the play are scripted as thug (called "gansta-bitch" in the script), and hippie.
Van (Linus), always the philosopher in childhood, is now a pothead with a worldview to match. He repeatedly attempts to pursue a sexual relationship with CB's Sister. 
Matt (Pig-Pen) is a pathological germophobe whose dirtiness has been internalized - he is sex-obsessed and homophobic, and terrorizes Beethoven mercilessly. He is also a football player, and is CB's best friend.
Tricia (Peppermint Patty), a party girl, who professes herself to be "Pretty" and "Popular". Though never spoken outright in the play, the general consensus is that her last name is York.
Marcy (Marcie), a party girl and Tricia's sidekick. She has a threesome with Tricia and Matt during the play.
Van's Sister (Lucy) has been institutionalized for setting the Little Red-Haired Girl's hair on fire.
Pen Pal does not appear in person, but has a key part in the play. This character additionally alludes to being a representation of God; he/she/it has a clear picture of an afterlife and signs letters with the initials CS (Charles Schulz).
Frieda is never seen, but referred to numerous times as having an eating disorder; Tricia hates her and openly comments on her weight, while Van thinks that she is actually too skinny.
Rerun and Franklin are both mentioned as being guests at Marcy’s party. Marcy refers to the former as Van’s “retard little brother” and addresses an offstage Franklin by name.

Plot 
CB and CB's sister have a funeral for their dog, who recently contracted rabies and was put down after killing "a little yellow bird" and nearly biting CB. Unfortunately, the funeral ends in failure as they argue over who should say a prayer for him. CB then goes to see his pothead friend Van, asking where people go when they die. Van, who claims to be Buddhist, says that spirits either dissolve away or get reincarnated. The next day at school CB asks his friend Matt where we go when we die. Matt gives him a more detailed explanation, proposing that when we die we return to a vagina, similar to being born, although the vagina does not belong to our mother. Beethoven walks by and Matt calls him a fag.

At lunch, Marcy and Tricia tell their friends about an upcoming party at Marcy's house. The two are clearly drunk and debate about the "Spork". Matt is disgusted by all the germs. CB goes to Beethoven's practice room to listen to his music. CB then monologues over his dead dog  which irritates Beethoven so much that, in return, Beethoven tells CB about how he cannot go through his day without someone bullying him in some sort, and tells CB that "messing around with me" means teasing and other sorts. CB makes a truce with Beethoven to re-establish their friendship. CB sits next to Beethoven while he plays, and then CB kisses Beethoven.

At the party, Beethoven, to everyone's surprise, walks in, and Matt calls Beethoven a fag again. CB comes to Beethoven's defense and kisses him again, this time in front of everyone. After abruptly leaving the party with CB, Beethoven demands an explanation of what happened. CB says he wanted to do that and in return, Beethoven kisses CB, leading to them (implicitly) having sex. The morning after, Matt, Tricia, and Marcy all wake up together, half-naked and wondering what happened between them the night before. CB goes to visit Van's sister, who was institutionalized for setting the Little Red-Haired Girl's hair on fire. CB tells her the whole story, also revealing to her that he and Beethoven had sex after the party.

A few days later, Matt, Tricia, Marcy, and Van eat lunch together and are all stunned at what happened. Matt vows to make Beethoven pay for "fucking with [his] best friend's head." After Matt storms off in a fit of anger, Tricia, Marcy and Van discuss how Matt has repressed homosexual feelings for CB and how Tricia bullies Frieda because she is jealous of Frieda. CB goes to see Beethoven and the two argue over whether or not they should be in a relationship. CB leaves disappointed but hopeful for the future between them. Matt enters and while Beethoven is practicing, Matt comes in and harasses him for being in love with CB. Matt tells him to stay away from CB, or else. Beethoven says no and calls him by his old nickname, Pig-Pen. It is also said that Beethoven realizes Matt's "secret", which may be an implication that Matt is a closeted homosexual. This angers Matt, who slams the piano top, breaking Beethoven's hands. Later on, the group has a talk about Beethoven, who is revealed to have committed suicide (Matt, meanwhile, was suspended from school for a week). CB is angered by this and berates them for pretending that they actually cared about him for all these years. 

Later on, CB gets a letter from his pen pal. In the letter he tells him that he must keep strong, even in rough times. The letter mentions a boy "who plays piano just like [CB's] friend" moved in near the pen pal, and mentions that "he's had a tough life, but things are better for him, now.", and that he found a dog who likes to sing along to the piano (like CB's dog did, alluding that Beethoven is now caring for CB's dog in the afterlife).  CB cries over the letter, as it meant so much to his friend, his dog, and himself. The letter is signed 'CS', an allusion to Peanuts creator Charles M. Schulz.

Intellectual property issues 
Dog Sees God is advertised as a parody, and includes language indicating that the production has not been authorized or approved by United Features Syndicate or the estate of Charles M. Schulz.

Development history 
Dog Sees God was first presented as a reading on May 3, 2004, at the Barrow Street Theatre.  It was directed by Anthony Barrile and produced by Sorrel Tomlinson. The cast was as follows:

Alexander Chaplin as CB
Karen DiConcetto as CB's Sister
Daniel Franzese as Van
Marcus Chait as Matt
Daniel Letterle as Beethoven
Mary Catherine Garrison as Tricia
Melissa Picarello as Marcy
Jennifer Esposito as Van's Sister

Dog Sees God had its world premiere at the 2004 New York International Fringe Festival.  It was presented at the SoHo Playhouse.  It was directed by Susan W. Lovell and produced by Sorrel Tomilinson/File 14 Productions.  The cast was as follows:

Michael Gladis as CB
Karen DiConcetto as CB's Sister
Tate Ellington as Van
Jay Sullivan as Matt
Benjamin Schrader as Beethoven
Bridget Barkan as Tricia
Stelianie Tekmitchov as Marcy
Melissa Picarello as Van's Sister
Understudies: Clay Black, Andrew Fleischer

The production was extended for two weeks and Daniel Franzese assumed the role of Van

Dog Sees God had another reading on May 9, 2005, at the Westside Theater.  It was directed by Trip Cullman and produced by DeDe Harris and Sorrel Tomlinson.  The cast was as follows:

Patrick Fugit as CB
Alison Pill as CB's Sister
John Gallagher Jr. as Van
Mark Webber as Matt
Logan Marshall Green as Beethoven
Michelle Trachtenberg as Tricia
Anna Paquin as Marcy
Carly Jibson as Van's Sister

Dog Sees God received its off-Broadway premiere by Martian Entertainment and Dede Harris at the Century Center for the Performing Arts, opening on December 15, 2005. Presented by Bert V. Royal, the play was directed by the Trip Cullman; the set design was by David Korins;  the costume design was by Jenny Mannis; the lighting design was by Brian MacDevitt; the sound design was by Darron L. West; the general manager was Roy Gabay; the production stage manager was Lori Ann Zepp; the assistant stage manager was Tammy Scozzafava; and the production manager was Randall Etheredge.

The cast was as follows.

Eddie Kaye Thomas as CB
America Ferrera as CB's Sister
Logan Marshall-Green as Beethoven
Ian Somerhalder as Matt
Keith Nobbs as Van
Kelli Garner as Tricia
Ari Graynor as Marcy
Eliza Dushku as Van's Sister
When Dushku (of Buffy the Vampire Slayer fame) quit in February 2006 along with several other members of the cast, attempts were made to tie their leaving to a lawsuit between the producers.  Charges of abuse against one of the producers were later dismissed as "plainly devoid of merit and undertaken as a vindictive campaign to harass".

The Los Angeles premiere of the play was presented by the Havok Theatre Company and ran from June 7 - July 20, 2008 at the Hudson Backstage Theatre. It was directed by Nick DeGruccio.

The Los Angeles cast was as follows.

Joseph Porter as CB
Andrea Bowen as CB's Sister
Erin Dinsmore as Van
Wyatt Fenner as Beethoven
Christine Lakin as Tricia
Lauren Robyne as Marcy
Nick Ballard as Matt
Megan McNulty as Van's Sister

Christine Lakin won an LA Weekly Theatre Award for Best Female Comedy Performance.

The U.K. premiere production took place at the Taurus Bar on Manchester's famous Canal Street in March 2008, thanks to author Bert V Royal helping them secure the UK rights, which at that time did not exist (after this production the U.K. rights were set up). The show was a sell out and quickly transferred to the larger venue The Lowry in January 2009. The production gained rave reviews and now looks set to move in to return in 2012. The play was produced by Award Nominated Vertigo Theatre Productions and directed by Craig Hepworth.

The U.K. cast was as follows:

 Rick Carter as CB
 Craig Hepworth as Beethoven
 Abby Simmons as CB's Sister
 Greg Kelly as Matt
 Emma Salt as Marcy
 Adele Stanhope as Tricia
 Stuart Reeve as Van
 Emma Willcox as Van's Sister

For The Lowry production, Greg Kelly and Abby Simmons were replaced with Mike Gates and Louise Allen due to scheduling conflicts. 

The Canadian premiere production took place at Six Degrees in Toronto, Ontario, in March 2009, produced by Michael Rubinoff and Lindsay Rosen. The show was directed by Lezlie Wade, with set and costume design by Jessica Poirier-Chang and lighting by Renee Brode. The Toronto Star gave it a -out-of-4-stars review, saying 'What seems to be a comedic deconstruction of the famous Peanuts cartoon characters turns out to be one of the most interesting and moving plays I've seen this year, with some absolutely stunning performances. Director Lezlie Wade manages the transition skilfully and, by the end, there were totally unexpected tears rolling down my face."The Canadian cast was as follows:

Jake Epstein as "CB"
Ben Lewis as "Beethoven"
Mike Lobel as "Matt"
Adamo Ruggiero as "Van"
Tatiana Maslany as "CB's Sis"
Sibohan Murphy as "Tricia"
Alex Saslove as "Marcy"
Paula Brancati as "Van's Sister"
Lindsay Clark was a female swing

 Awards 
In 2004, it was one of the breakout hits at the New York International Fringe Festival, winning the Excellence Award for Best Overall Production, as well as Theatermania's Play Award of 2004, the GLAAD Media Award for Best Off-Off-Broadway production, Broadway.com's 2006 Audience Award for Favorite Off-Broadway Production and the 2006 HX Award for Best Play.

 Sequel 
On July 24, 2014, it was announced on the official Facebook page that a sequel to the play was in the works. This sequel focuses on Matt, and will be titled The Gospel According to Matt: Confessions of a Teenage Dirtbag'''.

References

External links
 Dog Sees God: Confessions of a Teenage Blockhead from Dramatists Play Service
 Review of the play from Variety''
 Review of the play from The New York Times

2004 plays
American plays
Buddhism in fiction
Comedy-drama plays
LGBT-related plays
Off-Broadway plays
Parodies of comics
Unofficial works based on Peanuts (comic strip)
Satirical plays
Fiction about suicide